The Fires of Life is the third full-length album by Christian rock band Cool Hand Luke. It was released in 2004 on Floodgate Records. The album peaked at #12 on the Billboard Internet Albums Chart on June 12, 2004.

Track listing

References

2004 albums